Metade Fumaca (literally: Half cigarette) is a 1999 Hong Kong drama film directed by Riley Yip and starring Eric Tsang and Nicholas Tse.

Cast
 Eric Tsang as Roy 'Mountain Leopard'
 Nicholas Tse as Smokey
 Shu Qi as Nam
 Kelly Chen as Policewoman
 Sandra Ng as Third Sister
 Anthony Wong Chau-sang as Brother Kei	
 Terence Yin as Brother Chai
 Stephen Fung as Young Roy
 Sam Lee as Young Nine Dragons
 Elaine Jin as Smokey's mother
 Jo Kuk as Dee Dee
 Michael Chan as Older Nine Dragons
 Vincent Kok as White Hair Tiger	
 Stephen Tung as Assassin (flashback)
 Cheung Tat-ming as Master Twelve
 Tony Ho as Mad Dog Wah
 Wan Yeung-ming as Brother Wah

Accolades

External links
 IMDb entry
 hkcinemagic entry

1999 films
1999 drama films
Hong Kong drama films
1990s Cantonese-language films
Media Asia films
Golden Harvest films
Films set in Hong Kong
Films shot in Hong Kong
1990s Hong Kong films